The Anarchist Black Cross (ABC), formerly the Anarchist Red Cross, is an anarchist support organization. The group is notable for its efforts at providing prisoners with political literature, but it also organizes material and legal support for class struggle prisoners worldwide. It commonly contrasts itself with Amnesty International, which is concerned mainly with prisoners of conscience and refuses to defend those accused of encouraging violence. The ABC openly supports those who have committed illegal activity in furtherance of revolutionary aims that anarchists accept as legitimate.

History 

The Anarchist Black Cross offers aid to political prisoners.

In the early 20th century Russian Empire, dissidents including anarchists and socialists were jailed, exiled, or killed for their resistance to monarchy. Different political groups and organizations got together under Political Red Cross umbrella to provide material support for those repressed. Political Red Cross split when Social Democrats began filtering the group's support towards people with ideological alignment, thus creating the Anarchist Red Cross to help all social revolutionaries without regard to their political affiliation. By 1907, the Red Cross had expanded to Russia, Europe, and the United States, particularly as Russians fled persecution but from exile, continued to support imprisoned political dissidents. The Russian empire fell in 1917 and by releasing its political prisoners, obviated any need for the Red Cross, but as the Bolshevik communists rose and adopted the tsar's tactics, anarchists once again returned to prisoner aid. The group later changed its name from Red to Black Cross to not invoke the international humanitarian Red Cross.

Black Cross chapters in the early 20th century focused on helping anarchist dissidents during the Spanish Civil War, World War II, and in Francoist Spain. In the 1970s, the Black Cross turned away from international aid issues and towards local political issues. American chapters responded to increased government crackdown on radicals following the 1960s counterculture, in which activists were imprisoned during the Federal Bureau of Investigation's COINTELPRO program. The American Anarchist Black Cross supported around 100 jailed dissidents by the early 2010s.

In 1967, a British iteration of the Anarchist Black Cross sprouted upon Stuart Christie's return from Spanish prison. The group combined with Black Flag, which itself consisted of members of the Anarcho-Syndicalist Committee active in the 1950s and 60s. The Anarchist Black Cross is associated with publications including Black Flag (which has been produced since around 1970), Bulletin of the Anarchist Black Cross, Mutual Aid, and Taking Liberties. Black Flag, in particular, is known for its advocacy for "class war anarchism". In conjunction, the Anarchist Black Cross considers itself less attached to liberalism than groups like the Freedom Press. The Anarchist Black Cross continued its activity through at least the late 1990s.

The Black Cross's aid efforts include fundraising, acts of solidarity, support of prisoners and their families. Fundraising includes events that educate and involve community collaboration, and the funds raised buy prisoners stamps, writing implements, among other basic needs. Solidarity efforts include campaigns, letter-writing nights, sharing literature, and advocacy for hunger strikes and clemency. These acts aim to reduce prisoner isolation and improve their living conditions.

Black Army 
In 1918, Nestor Makhno organized new chapters of the Anarchist Black Cross as an adjunct to his anarchist Revolutionary Insurrectionary Army of Ukraine or Black Army in the territories of Ukraine which they controlled.

In September 1919, a grenade attack at a meeting of the Moscow Committee of the Bolshevik Party was used as a pretext for mass arrests of anarchists all over Russia by Bolshevik Red Army forces and the Cheka. Anarchist militants were arrested; even the Black Army and its general, Nestor Makhno, was hunted down at the orders of Leon Trotsky, determined to cleanse Russia of all anarchists with "an iron broom". It soon became clear that some kind of anarchist prisoner aid organization would have to be created once again to help anarchists in Bolshevik prisons. In Moscow, Kharkiv, Odesa, and many smaller cities new Anarchist Black Cross and similar organizations were formed such as the Society to Help Anarchist Prisoners, devoted mainly to supplying food to anarchists and other dissidents on the left. The work proved difficult, even where food was easy to obtain, as it would often be confiscated by Bolshevik Red guards encountered on the way.

Later years 
During the 1960s, the Anarchist Black Cross was reformed in Britain by Stuart Christie and Albert Meltzer with a focus on providing aid for anarchist prisoners in Francisco Franco's Spain. The reason for this was Christie's experience of the Spanish State's jail and the importance of receiving food parcels. At that time there were no international groups acting for Spanish anarchist and Resistance prisoners. The first action of the re-activated group was to bring Miguel García García, whom Christie met in prison, out of Spain on his release. He went on to act as the group's International secretary, working for the release of others. The group's bulletin became a newspaper—Black Flag—strongly allied with the anarchist tradition of revolutionary class conflict.

Several small American chapters merged in 1995 to form the Anarchist Black Cross Federation and unify their tactics for supporting political prisoners. A parallel organization, the Anarchist Black Cross Network, was formed in 2001 to pursue prison issues more generally, with looser conditions for membership. Anarchists contributed to the campaign to free Mumia Abu-Jamal, the jailed journalist and former Black Panther.

See also 
 Anarchist symbolism
 Louise Berger
 National Lawyers Guild
 November Coalition
 Olga Taratuta
 Prison abolition movement

References

Bibliography

External links 
 Anarchist Black Cross Federation website

International anarchist organizations
Cross symbols
Black symbols
Legal advocacy organizations
Prison abolition movement
Prison-related organizations
Anarchist organizations